Sloth is a graphic novel by American cartoonist Gilbert Hernandez, published by Vertigo (DC Comics) in 2006. The story opens with the teenaged Miguel Serra awakening from a year-long coma. The surreal tale unravels as its protagonists delve into the legends of the sleepy suburban town they live in. The book is unrelated to Hernandez's Palomar stories and is the first of Henandez's graphic novel not compiled from smaller parts.

References

 
 
 
 

2006 graphic novels
American graphic novels
Gilbert Hernandez
Vertigo Comics graphic novels